Rainer Mahlamäki (born 12 June 1956) is a Finnish architect, president of the Finnish Association of Architects (SAFA) from 2007 to 2011, Professor of Contemporary Architecture at the University of Oulu, and joint partner with Ilmari Lahdelma of the Helsinki-based architecture firm Lahdelma & Mahlamäki Architects, one of the most prolific such firms in Finland. A significant part of their work started as entries in architectural competitions, in which they have received 35 first prizes (and 59 other prizes).

Mahlamäki studied architecture at the Tampere University of Technology, and was awarded the Master of Science in Architecture in 1987. He, along with Lahdelma and 6 others, was a partner in the architecture firm 8 Studio from 1986 to 1993. From 1992 he together with Lahdelma and architect Mikko Kaira founded Kaira-Lahdelma-Mahlamäki Architecture, and from 1997 Mahlamäki and Lahdelma have been in partnership in the firm Lahdelma & Mahlamäki Architects.

Mahlamäki was appointed Professor of Contemporary Architecture at the University of Oulu Department of Architecture in 1997, from 2000 to 2007 he was head of the department and since 2007 vice-head of the department. In 2007 to 2011 he was appointed President of the Finnish Association of Architects (SAFA).

Mahlamäki was the Chair of the Jury for the 2009 International Architecture Awards.

Selection of works by Lahdelma & Mahlamäki Architects
The work of the firm Lahdelma & Mahlamäki Architects is generally split between the two partners, though with each having some input in all the works. The style of the firm has been described as contextual, varying dramatically in character depending on the project, from minimalism to expressionism. The contextualism is typified by Lahdelma's design of the Jyväskylä University Teacher Training School (2002) built adjacent to several buildings on the university campus designed by Alvar Aalto. The form of the new building complex was generated by the "site lines" of the surrounding buildings, resulting in a "fortress-like" appearance.

 Finnish Nature Centre Haltia, Espoo, Finland 2013
 Derby Business Park, Espoo, Finland, 2013
 Helsingin Studio, Residential Building, Helsinki, Finland, 2013
 Museum of the History of Polish Jews, Warsaw, Poland, 2013
 Helsingin Vanhalinna, Residential Building, Helsinki, Finland, 2012
 Meilahti Hospital Area, New Entrance Lobby, Helsinki, Finland, 2010
 Maritime Centre Vellamo, Kotka, Finland, 2008
 Wooden Boat Centre, Kotka, Finland, 2008
 Joensuu Primary School, Joensuu, Finland, 2006
 Evira, Finnish Food Safety Authority, Helsinki, Finland, 2006
 ICT-Building, Turku, 2006
 Helsingin Pasaatituuli, Residential Building, Helsinki, Finland, 2006
 Lusto Finnish Forest Museum, Extension Punkaharju, Finland, 2005
 Lohja City Library, Finland, 2005
 Exactum building, University of Helsinki, Finland, 2004
 Iiris, Office Building and Service Centre for the Visually Impaired, Helsinki, Finland, 2004
 Tapiola Church Yard, Urn Cemetery, Espoo, Finland, 2004
 Rauma Main Library, Rauma, Finland, 2003
 Office Building for Finland Post Corporation, Helsinki, Finland, 2003
 Jyväskylä University Teacher Training School, Jyväskylä, Finland, 2002
 Vaasa City Library, Vaasa, Finland, 2001
 Skanska Ltd. Headquarters, Helsinki, Finland, 2000
 Bulevardin Aaria, Residential Building, Helsinki, Finland, 2000
 Physicum building, University of Helsinki, Finland, 2001
 Folks Arts Centre, Kaustinen, Finland, 1997
 Soininen Primary School, Helsinki, Finland, 1997
 Festia building, Tampere University of Technology, Finland, 1995
 Lusto Finnish Forest Museum, Punkaharju, Finland, 1994

Awards to Lahdelma & Mahlamäki Architects
 Architectural Arts Suomi Award, 1997
 Finland Prize, Ministry of Education Award, 2008

Gallery of works by Lahdelma & Mahlamäki Architects

See also
 Architecture of Finland

References

External links
Lahdelma & Mahlamäki Architects official website

1956 births
Living people
People from Ilmajoki
Finnish architects
Academic staff of the University of Oulu